Dana Kugel (born 26 June 1997) is an Israeli female badminton player.

She won a silver medal at the 2017 Maccabiah Games.

Achievements

BWF International Challenge/Series
Women's Doubles

Mixed Doubles

 BWF International Challenge tournament
 BWF International Series tournament
 BWF Future Series tournament

References

External links
 

1997 births
Living people
Israeli female badminton players
Competitors at the 2017 Maccabiah Games
Maccabiah Games silver medalists for Israel
Maccabiah Games medalists in badminton
21st-century Israeli women